Franciscus Boncianni or Franciscus Boncianni (died 1620) was a Roman Catholic prelate who served as Archbishop of Pisa (1613–1620).

Biography
On 6 November 1613, Francesco Bonciani was appointed during the papacy of Pope Paul V as Archbishop of Pisa.
On 10 November 1613, he was consecrated bishop by Ottavio Bandini, Cardinal-Priest of Santa Sabina, with Attilio Amalteo, Titular Archbishop of Athenae, and Ulpiano Volpi, Archbishop of Chieti, serving as co-consecrators. 
He served as Archbishop of Pisa until his death in 1620.

References

External links and additional sources
 
  (for Chronology of Bishops) 
  (for Chronology of Bishops) 

17th-century Italian Roman Catholic archbishops
Bishops appointed by Pope Paul V
1620 deaths